Ruda Lubieniecka  is a village in the administrative district of Gmina Chodecz, within Włocławek County, Kuyavian-Pomeranian Voivodeship, in north-central Poland.

The village has a population of 121.

References

Ruda Lubieniecka